Mug-si was a Sumerian ruler (ensi) of the Mesopotamian city of Adab in the mid-3rd millennium BCE, probably circa 2400 BCE. He was the predecessor of E-iginimpa'e. 

His title was ensi-gar, or "Supreme Governor", the highest civil office in Adab.

Mug-si is only known from inscriptions, especially a land sale document where he appears with his title.

References

Sumerian kings
25th-century BC rulers